Safeplanet  is a Thai indie-pop band 3 people lead by the main vocalist Thitiphat “A” Arthachinua a music that combines guitar pop with DIY ethic in opposition to the style. Safeplanet (Safe Planet) means "Our safe area It's an area where we can perform our work comfortably.”

Band members 
 Thitipat "A" Arthachinda - Lead Vocals - guitarist
 Aphiwich "Doi" Khamfoo - drummer
 Chayapan "Yee" Chantranuson - bassist

History

The beginning 
Safeplanet is made up of three people who are all studying music in the Faculty of Music and subject of jazz. ‘A’ studied at Silpakorn University. Doi and Yi studied at Mahidol University.
The band was formed by former members of the band 'Shadow Flare', ‘A Thitipat Attchinda’ lead vocals – guitarist and 'Doi Aphiwit Khamfu’ drummer and they are a back-up for Jelly Rocket band. As a result, a new band was formed by Doi invited ‘Yee Chayapan Chantranuson' bassist, who was previously the back-up for Jelly Rocket band to record a song which would later become a member of Safeplanet.
'Safeplanet' is to describe a planet that is "Their secure zone with a comfortable environment in which we can perform ". They are a self-contained band that specializes in indie-pop music.
They had a very first single named “Klong Dam” which was released in 2016 and had a very popular song such as “Khamtop” and “Kot Khwam Chep Cham which are in “Safeboys” album. Also, they had a first concert which held on July 6, 2019, in the name of “Safeplanet Neonplanet Concert” at Montri Studio.

‘A Thitipat Attchinda’ lead vocals – guitarist: graduated with a bachelor's degree from Faculty of Music Silpakorn University.
'Doi Aphiwit Khamfu’ drummer - graduated with a bachelor's degree from College of Music Mahidol University.‘Yee Chayapan Chantranuson' bassist - graduated with a bachelor's degree from College of Music Mahidol University.

Safeplanet's identity: “Safeplanet's signature sound is guitar-banded. We use the guitar as a drive. And then there is a layer of chorus that is a unique singing. Consists of percussion We mix many types of music as if combining many pop music. type together Most of which, when incoming calls He will immediately know that it is us.”
Safeplanet's identity: “The inspiration for making music comes from real events that we felt at the time. For example, the song “Khaeng Khuek” comes from the people next to me. And I want to encourage him like "I'll take you." The people beside me are my girlfriends, friends, and family. Other than my girlfriend Ket and all the fans, of course, he's the one next to us, without them there wouldn't be us.”

Discography

Tours 

Neonplanet Concert (6 July 2019)

This is their first concert in 5 years since the debut of the song, which took place at Mon Tri Studio and featured Anatomy Rabbit as a special guest. The concert's theme and title were inspired by classical space and neon.

References 

 Montipa / Gandit Panthong, " พื้นที่ปลอดภัยสําหรับบทเพลงของ Safeplanet ", published by Fungjaizine on April 8, 2016
 Warittha Saejia, " วงการเพลงไทยไปได้อีกไกล แต่ทําไมไม่ถึงฝันเสียทีคุยเรื่องทิศทางวงดนตรีกับ Safeplanet ", published by the matter on December 2, 2020
 จิรภิญญา สมเทพ, " Safeplanet: ดาวเคราะห์แห่งเสียงดนตรีที่ออกจาก ‘กล่องดํา’ ด้วยฝันอยากโคจรรอบโลก ", published by the people, January 20, 2021
 Mover Team, "การเดินทางของ Safeplanet วงอินดี ้สุดคูลกับคอนเสิร์ตครั ้งแรกของพวกเขา ", published by Mover on May 30, 2019
 pphtphat, "#Jellytalk ทําความรู้จัก Safeplanet 3 หนุ่ม กับแนวดนตรีอินดี้ที่คุณฟังแล้วจะรัก! ", published by Jelly on June 13, 2019
 Vanrasa J., " รู้จัก Safeplanet วงดนตรีแนวอินดี้ป็อป ขวัญใจวัยรุ่นยุคใหม่ ", published by Thaiger on May 31, 2021
 " 'SAFEPLANET'วงดนตรีอินดี้ขวัญใจมหาชน ปล่อยเพลงใหม่ 'ถ้าเธอได้รู้'ทะลุล้านวิว ", published by Naewna on December 8, 2020
 " “Safeplanet Neonplanet Concert” จักรวาลนีออนอันแสนสง่างาม การเติบโต และการเรียนรู้ที่ไม่มีวันสิ้นสุด ", published by Sanook on July 29, 2019

Thai pop music groups